The Königsberg Castle was one of the landmarks of the East Prussian capital Königsberg, Germany (since 1946 Kaliningrad, Russia).

History 

The site of the castle was originally an Old Prussian fort known as Tuwangste near the Pregel River at an important waypoint in Prussian territory. Nearby were three Prussian villages, later known as Löbenicht, Sackheim, and Tragheim. After conquering the area in 1255, the Teutonic Knights constructed a provisionary wooden and earthworks fort in place of the Prussian one. By 1257, a new stone Ordensburg castle was being constructed. The castle was greatly enlarged and refortified in several stages between the 16th to 18th centuries.

The fortress, later designated a castle, was the residence of the Grandmasters of the Teutonic Order and later residence for Prussian rulers.

The 1815 Encyclopædia Britannica refers to "the magnificent palace in which is a hall 83.5 m long and 18 m broad without pillars to support it, and a handsome library. The gothic tower of the castle is very high (100 m) and has 284 steps to the top, from where a great distance can be seen". This extensive building, enclosed in a large quadrangle and situated almost in the center of the city, was formerly a seat of the Teutonic Order. It was altered and enlarged from the 16th to 18th centuries. The west wing contained the Schloßkirche, or palace church, where Frederick I was crowned in 1701 and William I in 1861. The arms emblazoned upon the walls and columns were those of members of the Order of the Black Eagle. Above the church was the 83 m long and 18 m high  Moscowiter-Saal, one of the largest halls in the German Reich.

Until the latter part of World War II, the apartments of the Hohenzollerns and the Prussia Museum (north wing) were open to the public daily. Among other things, the museum accommodated 240,000 exhibits of the Prussian collection, a collection of the Königsberg State and University Library, as well as many paintings by the artist Lovis Corinth. In 1926, Friedrich Lahrs led an excavation of the castle courtyard. During World War II, various pieces of captured Russian art were stored there, possibly including parts of the Amber Room. An extensive collection of provincial archives was also housed there. Also the Blutgericht, a wine selling tavern, was situated within the castle. An image of Hans von Sagan was used as the castle's weathervane.

Following the bombing of Königsberg by the Allies in the Second World War in 1944, the castle completely burnt down. However, the thick walls were able to withstand both the aerial bombing and Soviet artillery, as well as urban fighting in April 1945, allowing the ruins of the castle to stay standing. The largely demolished Königsberg became part of the Soviet Union and was renamed Kaliningrad in 1946.

Kaliningrad was to be rebuilt as a model town on the remains of Königsberg, without reminders of the German past left standing. Despite protests from students and intellectuals from Kaliningrad, the ruins of the castle were periodically blown up over the next several years, with the last remnants being destroyed in 1968 on Leonid Brezhnev's personal orders. However, the ruins of the nearby Königsberg Cathedral, which included the tomb of Immanuel Kant, were left standing, and, after the collapse of the USSR, in the late 1990s and early years of the 21st century were rebuilt and restored.

Current situation 

Today Kaliningrad is part of Russia. The centre square of Kaliningrad resides on the site of the castle which, despite its name, actually lies to the southeast of the town centre. Adjacent to the centre square on the filled-in moat is the "House of Soviets", which in 1960 was intended to be the central administration building. Continuation of development was stopped in the 1980s as the massive building gradually sank into the structurally unsound soil stemming from the collapse of tunnels in the old castle's subterranean levels. Many people call this the "Revenge of the Prussians" or "The Monster". The outside of the building was finally completed pending a visit by President Putin in 2005. The inside remains unfinished.

The current Kaliningrad city administration debated whether to rebuild the castle with the financial assistance of the Russian Department of Culture. In contrast to the Königsberger Dom, there would be the difficult task of erecting the castle from scratch, so plans were dropped for the time being. Instead, the centre square is cobbled.

In June 2010, the regional Minister of Culture, Mikhail Andreyev, announced that a referendum on the reconstruction of the castle would be held in the city of in March 2011. Previously, it had been intended to hold the referendum in October 2010, but budgetary pressures caused a delay.

Since September 2001, the German magazine Der Spiegel has financed the excavation of parts of the castle's cellar, which was carried out with the Kaliningrad Regional Museum of History and Arts. It is hoped that various buried treasures of the previous castle museum are uncovered, and possibly the rest of the Amber Room. During the Second World War the Amber Room was transferred by Germany to Königsberg where it was installed in one of the halls of the Castle. Here its traces were lost. So far, thousands of items have been discovered. In June 2005, an occult silver casket with medals and amulets was found, causing a sensation among experts. It is planned that after completion of the excavation, parts of the castle's vaults will be made accessible as an open-air museum.

Gallery

See also 
 Potsdam Agreement
 Heart of the City (Kaliningrad)

References

Bibliography

External links 

 An illustrative account of the castle 

1255 establishments in Europe
1945 disestablishments in Germany
Castles of the Teutonic Knights
Castle
Former castles in Germany
Former castles in Russia
Demolished buildings and structures in Russia
Demolished buildings and structures in Germany
Prussian cultural sites
Buildings and structures in Germany destroyed during World War II